Paradox (Georgian: პარადოქსი) is the first joint Georgian-Ukrainian TV series. The premiere took place in Georgia on TV channel GDS February 2, 2014.

Plot
Young, successful scientist, Irakli (Rati Tsiteladze) who is researching the afterlife, is suddenly struck by family tragedy. After attempting suicide and five month of coma, he wakes up in a post-apocalyptic world full of vampires.  He then searches for his wife.

Cast 
 Ia Sukhitashvili as Tina
 Tornike Gogrichiani as Guga
 Anastasia Sheremet as Rita
 Giorgi Maskharashvili as Giorgi
 Aleks Komarovskii as Petro
 Nanka Kalatozishvili as Elene
 Zaza Kolelishvili as Niko
 Dato Darchia as Qartlosi

References

External links

 Paradox official website
 Paradox official website

Ukrainian television series
2010s Ukrainian television series
2010s Georgia (country) television series
2014 Ukrainian television series debuts